Bhutan competed at the 2004 Summer Olympics in Athens, Greece, from 13 to 29 August 2004. This was the nation's sixth consecutive appearance at the Olympics.

Bhutan Olympic Committee sent two athletes to compete only in both men's and women's individual archery. Bhutan had been given wild cards for both events, to ensure that all 204 National Olympic Committees could take part even if no athletes had qualified.

Archery 

Two Bhutan archers qualified each for the men's and women's individual archery.

References

External links
Official Report of the XXVIII Olympiad

Nations at the 2004 Summer Olympics
2004
Olympics